Sinpunctiptilia emissalis is a moth of the family Pterophoridae. It is found in Australia, including Tasmania.

Its wingspan is about 20 mm. Adults have brown plumes, with two pale marks near each forewing apex, and several dark marks on each forewing costa.

The larvae feed on the leaves of Derwentia perfoliata.

References

External links
Australian Insects

Platyptiliini
Moths of Australia
Moths described in 1864
Taxa named by Francis Walker (entomologist)